The Hamburg Football Association, the HFV, is one of 21 state organisations of the German Football Association, the DFB, and covers the state of Hamburg and some parts of southern Schleswig-Holstein.

Overview

The HFV is also part of the Northern German Football Association, one of five regional federations in Germany. The other members of the regional association are the Bremen Football Association, the Lower Saxony Football Association and the Schleswig-Holstein Football Association.

In 2017, the HFV had 181,233 members, 469 member clubs and 3,371 teams playing in its league system.

References

External links
 DFB website  
 NFV website  
 HFV website 

Football in Hamburg
Organisations based in Hamburg
Football governing bodies in Germany
1947 establishments in Germany